Martina Nemec (born 21 January 1976) is an Austrian breaststroke, freestyle and medley swimmer. She competed at the 1992 Summer Olympics and the 1996 Summer Olympics.

References

External links
 

1976 births
Living people
Austrian female breaststroke swimmers
Austrian female freestyle swimmers
Austrian female medley swimmers
Olympic swimmers of Austria
Swimmers at the 1992 Summer Olympics
Swimmers at the 1996 Summer Olympics
People from Mödling
Sportspeople from Lower Austria